The 1955 Tennessee Tech Golden Eagles football team represented Tennessee Polytechnic Institute—now known as Tennessee Technological University–as a member of the Ohio Valley Conference (OVC) during the 1955 college football season. Led by second-year head coach Wilburn Tucker, the Golden Eagles compiled an overall record of 7–3 with a mark of 5–0 in conference play, winning the OVC title. The team's co-captains were Dean Kirk and Joe Mac Reeves.

Schedule

References

Tennessee Tech Golden Eagles football
Tennessee Tech Golden Eagles football seasons
Ohio Valley Conference football champion seasons
Tennessee Tech